The 1991 Dutch Supercup, known as the PTT Telecom Cup for sponsorship reasons, was the second Supercup match in Dutch football. The game was played on 14 August 1991 at De Kuip in Rotterdam, between 1990–91 Eredivisie champions PSV Eindhoven and 1990–91 KNVB Cup winners Feyenoord. Feyenoord won the match 1–0.

Match details

References

1991
Supercup
D
D
Dutch Supercup